Spinn Inc. is a San Francisco-based coffee-subscription business. The coffee makers from Spinn, are said to be Wi‑Fi–connected and app-controlled, and thus, these are said to demand minimal effort from the users.

Overview 
Spinn Inc is a hardware enabled coffee marketplace and was founded in 2015 by Roderick de Rode, Serge de Warrimont and Roland Verbeek.

Spinn is provides its users with a curated coffee roaster platform through which the users are given various choices about their coffee, and this platform is currently said to have over 150 connected roasters for fulfilling the users’ coffee bean orders as of 2017.

Technology 
Spinn's coffee maker uses patented centrifugal brewing process and an integrated grinder. The centrifugal technology is said to variable stepless rotating speed between 500 rpm to 8000 rpm, the decides the extraction level, and amount of coffee and water used.

This coffee maker is app-controllable, and every aspect from ordering and brewing to coffee preparation can be controlled through Spinn's proprietary iOS and Android-based mobile application. This app has the Alexa integration feature, which allows the users to talk to their coffee makers.

Spinn has been taking pre-orders for their coffee maker since 2017, though an original shipping date of mid-2017 was missed but as for 2020 customers have received their orders. While the company started shipping a small number of machines for beta testing in early 2018, many of their crowdfunding backers have become restless due to the delay.  As of Jan 2020, Spinn has announced shipping dates on their website. Spinn closed a $20MM funding round in 2021 - bringing the total to $37MM.

References 

Companies based in San Francisco
Food and drink companies established in 2014
American companies established in 2014